Prajnesh Gunneswaran was the defending champion but lost in the third round to Benjamin Bonzi.

James Duckworth won the title after defeating Bonzi 6–4, 6–4 in the final round.

Seeds
All seeds receive a bye into the second round.

Draw

Finals

Top half

Section 1

Section 2

Bottom half

Section 3

Section 4

References

External links
Main draw
Qualifying draw

2020 ATP Challenger Tour
2020 Singles